José Giacone (born 5 January 1971 in Argentina) is an Argentinean retired footballer.

References

Argentine footballers
Association football defenders
1971 births
Living people
Sportivo Italiano footballers